Minieri is an Italian surname. Notable people with the surname include:

Dario Minieri (born 1985), Italian poker player
Mario Minieri (born 1938), Italian cyclist
Michelangelo Minieri (born 1981), Italian footballer

Italian-language surnames